Endingen may refer to:

Endingen am Kaiserstuhl, Germany
Endingen, part of Jakobsdorf municipality in Vorpommern-Rügen, Germany
Endingen, Switzerland in the canton of Aargau